John Moloney (1935 - 6 October 2006) was an Irish Gaelic football and hurling referee. Born in Bansha, County Tipperary, Moloney first played competitive Gaelic football and hurling with Galtee Rovers. His subsequent refereeing career spanned six decades from 1958 to 2003.

After beginning his refereeing career at club level in 1958, Moloney took charge of his first inter-county championship game in 1965. After handling the Railway Cup final in 1967, he later took take charge of that year's All-Ireland football final. Moloney refereed a further four All-Ireland football finals (1969, 1973, 1975 and 1977) as well as the 1974 All-Ireland hurling final.

In 2022, Martin Breheny named him among "five of the best football referees".

References

1935 births
2006 deaths
All-Ireland Senior Football Championship Final referees
Dual players
Gaelic football referees
Galtee Rovers Gaelic footballers
Galtee Rovers hurlers
Hurling referees
Irish farmers